Amana is an unincorporated community and census-designated place (CDP) in Iowa County, Iowa, United States. It is one of the Amana Colonies, seven villages built by German Pietists in the 19th century. As of the 2020 census, Amana had a population of 388, down from 442 in the 2010 census.

Geography
Amana is in northeastern Iowa County, on the south side of Price Creek in the valley of the Iowa River. It is bordered to the west by Lily Pond and the village of Middle Amana, while East Amana is to the east. U.S. Route 151 passes through Amana, leading northeast  to Cedar Rapids and south  to U.S. Route 6 at Homestead. Iowa Highway 220 leads west through the villages of Middle Amana, High Amana, and West Amana, ultimately reaching US 6 at South Amana,  from Amana village.

Demographics

See also
Amana Colonies

References

Unincorporated communities in Iowa County, Iowa
Unincorporated communities in Iowa
Census-designated places in Iowa County, Iowa